Bangalore South Assembly seat is one of the seats in Karnataka state assembly in India. It is part of the Bangalore Rural Lok Sabha seat. Notably, the Bangalore South Lok Sabha constituency does not contain the Bangalore South Assembly constituency.

Bangalore South Assembly seat was created when delimitation of seats was carried out in 2008. While there are four Lok Sabha seats with the name of the city 'Bangalore' in their title, Bangalore South is the only Assembly seat among dozens in the city boundary which has the word 'Bangalore' in its title.

Members of Assembly

Mysore State
 1951 (Seat-1): A. V. Narasimha Reddy, Indian National Congress
 1951 (Seat-2): B. T. Kempa Raj, Indian National Congress
 1957 (Seat-1): A. V. Narasimha Reddy, Indian National Congress
 1957 (Seat-2): B. Basavalingappa, Indian National Congress
 1962: D. Munichinnappa, Independent
 1967-1973 : Seat did not exist

Karnataka State
 1973-2008 : Seat did not exist
 2008 : M. Krishnappa, Bharatiya Janata Party
 2013 : M. Krishnappa, Bharatiya Janata Party

Election results

2008 Assembly Election
 M Krishnappa (BJP) : 71,114 votes    
 Sadananda M (INC) : 36,979

2013 Assembly Election
 M Krishnappa (BJP) : 102,207 votes    
 R. Prabhakara Reddy (JD-S) : 72,045

2018 Assembly Election
 M Krishnappa (BJP) : 152,469 votes  
 R K Ramesh (INC) : 122,052 votes

See also 
 List of constituencies of Karnataka Legislative Assembly

References 

Assembly constituencies of Karnataka